The Oh-My-God particle was an ultra-high-energy cosmic ray detected on 15 October 1991 by the Fly's Eye camera in Dugway Proving Ground, Utah, U.S. It is the highest-energy cosmic ray ever observed.
This particle's energy was unexpected and called into question theories of that era about the origin and propagation of cosmic rays.

Comparisons
Although this amount is phenomenally large – far outstripping the highest energy that human technology can generate – it is still far below the level of the Planck scale, where exotic physics is expected.

Comparison to a photon
Its energy was 20 million times greater than the highest photon energy measured in electromagnetic radiation emitted by an extragalactic object, the blazar Markarian 501.

Comparison to a proton
At this speed, if a photon were travelling alongside the particle, it would take over 215,000 years for the photon to gain a 1 cm lead, as seen from the Earth's reference frame. Due to special relativity, the relativistic time dilation experienced by a proton traveling at this speed would be extreme. If the proton originated from a distance of 1.5 billion light years, it would take approximately 1.71 days from the reference frame of the proton to travel that distance. 

The energy of this particle was some 40 million times that of the highest-energy protons that have been produced in any terrestrial particle accelerator. However, only a small fraction of this energy would be available for an interaction with a proton or neutron on Earth, with most of the energy remaining in the form of kinetic energy of the products of the interaction. For the Oh-My-God particle, this gives , which is roughly 60 times higher than the highest collision energy of the Large Hadron Collider (as of 2015).

High, but far below the Planck scale
While the particle's energy was higher than anything achieved in terrestrial accelerators, it was still about 40 million times lower than the Planck energy. Particles of that energy would be required in order to expose effects on the Planck scale. A proton with that much energy would travel  times closer to the speed of light than the Oh-My-God particle did.

Later similar events
Since the first observation, at least seven similar events (energy  or greater) have been recorded, confirming the phenomenon. These ultra-high-energy cosmic ray particles are very rare; the energy of most cosmic ray particles is between  eV and  eV.

More recent studies using the Telescope Array Project have suggested a source of the particles within a 20 degree radius "warm spot" in the direction of the constellation Ursa Major.

See also

References

Cosmic rays
1991 in science
1991 in Utah
Individual physical objects